"Royal Flush" is the debut solo single by American rapper and OutKast member Big Boi. The track was released on March 24, 2008 and it features fellow OutKast member André 3000 as well as Wu-Tang Clan member Raekwon. It was the first time the three rappers collaborated with each other in 10 years since "Skew It on the Bar-B" off of OutKast's third album Aquemini in 1998. The song was intended to be included as part of Big Boi's debut solo album Sir Lucious Left Foot: The Son of Chico Dusty, but was removed from it, due to legal complications from Big Boi resigning from Jive Records.

This song contains sampled elements from the song "Voyage to Atlantis" by the Isley Brothers between each verse. Big Boi refers to this when at the end of his verse he says, "take a voyage to Atlantis".

The song was nominated for Best Rap Performance by a Duo or Group at the 51st Grammy Awards.

Charts

References

2007 songs
2008 debut singles
Big Boi songs
André 3000 songs
Songs written by André 3000
Music videos directed by Scott Speer
Songs written by Raekwon
Songs written by Big Boi
LaFace Records singles